Ahmednagar district is a district in state of Maharashtra in India. There are 14 talukas (talukas) in Ahmednagar.

District Subdivisions
Ahmednagar district is divided into four district subdivisions.

List of talukas in Ahmednagar district by area
The Table below list all 14 talukas of Ahmednagar district in the Indian state of Maharashtra along with district subdivision, area, largest city and location map in the district information.

List of talukas in Ahmednagar district by population
The table below lists important geographic and demographic parameters for all 14 talukas of Ahmednagar district. Population data is extracted from the 2001 Census of India.

List of talukas in Ahmednagar district by rain fall
The Table below list all 14 talukas of Ahmednagar district in the Indian state of Maharashtra by average rain fall along with each year rainfall information from 1981 to 2004.

See also
 Ahmednagar district
 talukas in Pune district

References

 
 
Maharashtra-related lists